This article lists events that occurred during 2002 in Estonia.

Incumbents
President – Arnold Rüütel
Prime Minister – Siim Kallas

Events
3 September – Riigikogu ratifies Kyoto Protocol.
October – local elections took place.

Births

Deaths

See also
 2002 in Estonian football
 2002 in Estonian television

References

 
2000s in Estonia
Estonia
Estonia
Years of the 21st century in Estonia